Ziridava xylinaria, the indistinct carpet, is a moth in the family Geometridae. The species was first described by Francis Walker in 1863. It is found in Sri Lanka, India, Hong Kong and on Peninsular Malaysia, Borneo, Java and possibly the Philippines and Sulawesi.

Description
The wingspan is about 28 mm in the male and 34 mm in the female. Body very pale brown with rufous, fuscous, and silvery scaly speckles. Forewings with four lines between the base and middle, very highly angled below costa, and dark, then rufous and oblique to inner margin. A large fuscous and rufous patch found beyond the cell bounded by the double postmedial line, which is angled beyond the cell, then incurved to inner margin, and with an indistinct dentate line beyond it. A rufous and fuscous patch on the margin below apex. There is an indistinct almost straight, pale submarginal line. Hindwings with traces of numerous waved lines. A sub-basal dark band and a postmedial rufous line angled found beyond cell. It comprised with dark marks inside it from vein 4 to inner margin.

Subspecies
Ziridava xylinaria baliensis Prout, 1958
Ziridava xylinaria florensis Prout, 1958
Ziridava xylinaria kanshireiensis Prout, 1958
Ziridava xylinaria khasiensis Prout, 1958
Ziridava xylinaria rubridisca Hampson, 1891
Ziridava xylinaria subaequata Prout, 1929

References

Moths described in 1863
Eupitheciini